Anna-Maria Fernandez (born October 22, 1960) is an American former professional tennis player active during the 1980s. She won five WTA titles during her career, all in doubles. Her career high ranking in singles was number 19, in approximately 1979–1980. She was a member of the University of Southern California's national championship team (1979 and 1980) and captured the AIAW singles national championship title in 1981. She was named the National Collegiate Player of the Year (1981) winning the Broderick Award (now the Honda Sports Award) as the nation's best female collegiate tennis player. She earned a BA degree in Broadcast Journalism from USC (1983).

She is married to former tennis player Ray Ruffels and the mother of professional golfers Ryan Ruffels and Gabriela Ruffels. She is of Peruvian American ancestry.

WTA Tour finals

Singles 1

Doubles 5 (4–1)

References

External links
 
 

1960 births
American female tennis players
American sportspeople of Peruvian descent
Sportspeople from Torrance, California
Tennis people from California
Living people
21st-century American women
USC Trojans women's tennis players